Kamlar (also known as Kaşlar) is a village in Jafarbay-ye Gharbi Rural District, Gomishan District, Torkaman County, Golestan Province, Iran. At the 2006 census, its population was 787, in 152 families.

References 

Populated places in Torkaman County